During the 2023 Brazilian Congress attack, numerous works of art were targeted by supporters of Brazilian former president Jair Bolsonaro.

Background 

Brasília, the federal capital of Brazil, is a planned city and its architecture is considered unique in the world. The city was declared a UNESCO World Heritage Site in 1987 and is divided into numbered blocks as well as sectors for specified activities, such as the Hotel Sector, the Banking Sector, and the Embassy Sector. Since it is the seat of government of Brazil, Brasília houses several diplomatic gifts and artworks that are displayed in international and Brazilian art exhibitions, including in the Cultural Complex of the Republic. Government buildings in Brasília are not only works of art themselves due to their modernist architecture, but they also work as museums, libraries and theaters to officials and the general population who come to the city seeking government services and as visitors.

Artworks 
Many artworks were torn apart, shredded, broken, graffitied or simply stolen by the attackers in the assault. Early reports estimate that BRL 9 milion (nearly USD 1.7 million) in works of art alone (government buildings not included) were lost in the attack. The following artworks were damaged, destroyed or stolen by the perpetrators:

Aftermath 
After the attacks and the perpetrators left the government buildings, Brazilian Culture Minister Margareth Menezes announced UNESCO had offered its expert team to help repair restorable artworks. Additionally she reached out to the National Institute of Historic and Artistic Heritage (Iphan) conservationists and restorers so they could also help repair the works of art.

On February 19, 2023, Switzerland offered to help Brazil restore the French 17th century clock (made by Balthazar Martinot and targeted by a Bolsonaro supporter during the attacks) in a partnership with Swiss watchmaker company Audemars Piguet, which was accepted by the Brazilian Culture ministry.

See also 
2023 in Brazil
Art destruction
January 6 United States Capitol attack
Looting

References

21st century in Brasília
Attacks on buildings and structures in 2023
Attacks on buildings and structures in Brazil
Brazilian culture
Conflicts in 2023
January 2023 events in Brazil
Riots and civil disorder in Brazil
Vandalized works of art in Brazil
Lists of works of art